The discography of Mark Schultz, an American Christian music performer, consists of nine studio albums, 18 singles, and five music videos.

Mark has had ten no.1 singles, won a Dove award for his album Live A Night of Stories and Songs in 2006 and been nominated 14 other times, gone off to be a platinum artist, and sold over 2 million records worldwide.

Albums

Studio albums

Live albums

Compilations

Extended plays

Singles

Promotional singles

Other appearances

Music videos

References

External links
  Official website

Discographies of American artists
Schultz, Mark